Nikolin Arra (born 1 June 1991 in Shkoder) is an Albanian professional basketball player who currently plays for BC Vllaznia in the Albanian Albanian Basketball League.

References

1991 births
Living people
Albanian men's basketball players
Basketball players from Shkodër
Power forwards (basketball)